Kensaku Maeda is a Japanese former professional Kickboxer, former K-1 WORLD GP Japan producer. He is also renowned as the founder and head trainer of the successful kickboxing gym Team Dragon.

Biography

Early Years
In his youth Maeda was fan of Tiger Mask and Bruce Lee's movies which sparked his interest in martial arts, he later joined the Caesar Gym in Tokyo. The affiliation with Takeshi Caesar's gym led him to make his professional debut with the Shootboxing organization.

Maeda made his Muay Thai debut in 1989 at the Nakhon Pathom Stadium where he won by decision, following the experience he decided to switch from Shootboxing rules to Japanese Kickboxing in Japan and joined the All Japan Kickboxing Federation with the ambition to be ranked in the major Bangkok Stadiums.

Kickboxing career
in the late 1980s one of Maeda's main trainer, Singsak Muangsurin a former Rajadamnern Stadium Junior Welterweight Champion, decided to left Caesar Gym and create the Singsak Victory Gym (S.V.G).
Maeda followed Singsak but S.V.G didn't have a local and fighters had to train in dire conditions under a bridge in Setagaya. 
Despite this situation Kensaku Maeda managed to won his first title on July 18, 1992, against his rival Atsushi Tateshima taking the AJKF Featherweight Championship belt by decision. Overcoming this situation and becoming champion attracted attention from the media and his popularity grew importantly.

Maeda lost his AJKF Featherweight title in a rematch with Atsushi Tateshima on November 27, 1993. He rebounded by winning his first world title the next year on July 30, 1994, against the American Lawrence Miera by TKO for the WKA Muay Thai World Super Featherweight title.
His fighting success added to his good looks made him a popular figure in media. In 1994 The character Shinsaku Maekawa in the video game Battle K-Road was directly inspired from Maeda. In 1996 he played the main role in the movie adaptation of the popular manga Rokudenashi Blues.

On July 25, 1997, he defended his WKA Muay Thai World title against the Australian Craig Pace by second-round KO. Four months later he made his K-1 debut for the Japan Featherweight Grand Prix at the K-1 Grand Prix '97 Final event, he lost to Takehiro Murahama by decision. 
Following this loss Maeda went away from the rings for almost two years. During his time off he took back his role from the Rokudenashi Blues movie in Rokudenashi Blues '98. He also appeared in the live-action adaptation of Abare Bunya.

In 1999 Kensaku Maeda founded Team Dragon with Taishin Kohiruimaki and Charn a Thai trainer. Maeda made his return to the ring on August 22 at K-1 Spirits '99 where he stopped Karim Nassar by second-round TKO.
On December 5, 1999, Maeda faced Australia's Brad Hemming at K-1 Grand Prix '99 Final Round. He won by first-round knockout.
On March 19, 2000, Maeda face Muay Thai legend Chamuekpet Hapalang at the K-1 Burning 2000 event. He was defeated by unanimous decision after five rounds.
On May 12, 2000, at K-1 King of the Ring 2000 Maeda won a double world title match beating Massimo Rizzoli by second-round TKO. He conserved the WKA Muay Thai World title and won the WAKO PRO Muay Thai World Super Featherweight title.

Maeda's retirement fight happened on October 11, 2002, at K-1 World MAX 2002 Champions' Challenge. He won a three rounds unanimous decision against Miroslav Safra.

After career
The day following his retirement fight Maeda officially opened his own Kickboxing gym called Team Dragon in Tokyo and would focus on being a Kickboxing instructor.

His work showed impressive results quickly some of his students (Taishin Kohiruimaki, Ryuji Kajiwara, Junichiro Sawayashiki, Keiji Ozaki) started to win titles in various organizations.

On January 28, 2008 K-1 hired Maeda to supervise the youth development of future K-1 fighters leading to the creation of K-1 Koshien, a tournament to determine the best under 18 amateur kickboxers of the country.

In 2010 Team Dragon and Maeda received the Best Dojo award for their success in the Shin Karate Grand Prix.
In the early 2010s Team Dragon emerged as one of the best kickboxing gym of Japan with fighters such as Hirotaka Urabe, Koya Urabe, Hideaki Yamazaki or Takeru.

On May 25, 2014, Maeda was introduced as producer of the newly created K-1 WORLD GP JAPAN, he had to leave the head of Team Dragon rebranded K-1 Gym Dragon to one of his trainers Masakazu Watanabe.

On September 9, 2016, for undisclosed reasons Maeda was forced to resign by the K-1 company and replaced by Mitsuru Miyata the former Krush producer.

Team Dragon Gym was freed from the K-1 affiliation but the fighters attached to it stayed with K-1 and as a result over 20 of his fighters, including his best champions, transferred to the newly created K-1 Gym KREST with Masakazu Watanabe as the head trainer.

Titles and accomplishments
All Japan Kickboxing Federation
 1992 AJKF Featherweight Champion
World Kickboxing Association
 1994 WKA Muay Thai World Super Featherweight Champion (defended three times)
World Association of Kickboxing Organizations
 2000 WAKO PRO Muay Thai World Super Featherweight Champion

 Notable Students 

Kickboxing record

|-  style="background:#cfc;"
| 2002-10-11|| Win ||align=left| Miroslav Safra || K-1 World MAX 2002 Champions' Challenge ||  Tokyo, Japan || Decision (Unanimous) || 3|| 3:00
|-  style="background:#cfc;"
| 2000-07-26|| Win ||align=left| Ben Smullen || WOLF REVOLUTION 〜First Wave〜 ||  Tokyo, Japan || KO (Left Knee) || 2 || 3:00
|-  style="background:#cfc;"
| 2000-05-12|| Win ||align=left| Massimo Rizzoli || K-1 King of the Ring 2000 ||  Bologna, Italy || TKO || 2 || 2:35 
|-
! style=background:white colspan=9 |
|-  style="background:#fbb;"
| 2000-03-19|| Loss ||align=left| Chamuakpetch Haphalung || K-1 Burning 2000 ||  Yokohama, Japan || Decision (Unanimous) || 5 || 3:00
|-  style="background:#cfc;"
| 1999-12-05|| Win ||align=left| Brad Hemming || K-1 Grand Prix '99 Final Round ||  Tokyo, Japan || KO (Left Kick) || 1 || 1:33
|-  style="background:#cfc;"
| 1999-08-22|| Win ||align=left| Karim Nassar || K-1 Spirits '99 ||  Tokyo, Japan || TKO (Corner Stoppage) || 2 || 0:27
|-  style="background:#fbb;"
| 1997-11-09|| Loss||align=left| Takehiro Murahama || K-1 Grand Prix '97 Final Japan Featherweight Tournament Semi Finals  ||  Tokyo, Japan || Decision (Unanimous) || 3 || 3:00
|-  style="background:#cfc;"
| 1997-09-28|| Win ||align=left| James Burgess || AJKF KICK OVER-IX ||  Tokyo, Japan || TKO (Corner Stoppage) || 2 || 0:27
|-  style="background:#cfc;"
| 1997-07-25|| Win ||align=left| Craig Pace || AJKF ||  Tokyo, Japan || KO || 2 || 0:56 
|-
! style=background:white colspan=9 |
|-  style="background:#cfc;"
| 1997-04-29|| Win ||align=left| Souleymane Suleimani || AJKF ||  Tokyo, Japan || KO || 2 ||
|-  style="background:#cfc;"
| 1997-01-31|| Win ||align=left| Arnee Sor.Suwanpakdee || AJKF ||  Tokyo, Japan || KO || 2 ||
|-  style="background:#fbb;"
| 1996-03-24|| Loss ||align=left| Riki Onodera || AJKF ||  Yokohama, Japan || Decision || 5 || 3:00
|-  style="background:#fbb;"
| 1996-02-02|| Loss ||align=left| Tongsak Bor.Kor.Sor || Lumpinee Stadium ||  Bangkok, Thailand || Decision || 5 || 3:00
|-  style="background:#cfc;"
| 1995-07-30|| Win ||align=left| Khaled Ebieb || AJKF CHALLENGER-IX～ALL OR NOTHING ||  Tokyo, Japan ||  ||  ||
|-
! style=background:white colspan=9 |
|-  style="background:#;"
| 1995-01-07|| ||align=left| Marcel Karus || AJKF HOLDING OUT FOR A HERO ||  Tokyo, Japan ||  ||  ||
|-  style="background:#cfc;"
| 1994-11-26|| Win ||align=left| Maikel Lieuwfat || AJKF DESTINY X ||  Tokyo, Japan || KO (Spinning back fist) || 5 || 1:52
|-
! style=background:white colspan=9 |
|-  style="background:#cfc;"
| 1994-07-30|| Win ||align=left| Lawrence Miera || AJKF DESTINY VII||  Nagoya, Japan || TKO (Corner Stoppage) || 2 || 3:00  
|-
! style=background:white colspan=9 |
|-  style="background:#cfc;"
| 1994-05-20|| Win ||align=left| John Ford || AJKF DESTINY V||  Tokyo, Japan || KO (Knees to the Body) || 2 || 1:32
|-  style="background:#fbb;"
| 1993-11-27|| Loss||align=left| Atsushi Tateshima || AJKF EVOLUTION step-8||  Tokyo, Japan || KO (Right Elbow) || 3 || 0:49
|-
! style=background:white colspan=9 |
|-  style="background:#;"
| 1993-09-25|| ||align=left| Hayashi (林成根)|| AJKF Evolution STEP 6||  Tokyo, Japan ||  ||  ||
|-  style="background:#fbb;"
| 1993-05-22|| Loss ||align=left| Peemai Or.Yuttanakorn || AJKF ||  Tokyo, Japan || TKO (Corner Stoppage) || 4 ||
|-  style="background:#;"
| 1993-04-11||  ||align=left| Fapikart Luktabfar || Channel 7 Stadium ||  Bangkok, Thailand ||  ||  ||
|-  style="background:#cfc;"
| 1992-11-14|| Win ||align=left| Billy Bowen || AJKF in Las Vegas||  Las Vegas, United States || KO (Right Middle Kick) || 4 || 1:21
|-  style="background:#cfc;"
| 1992-07-18|| Win ||align=left| Atsushi Tateshima || AJKF EVOLUTION One Truth 5th||  Tokyo, Japan || Decision (Majority) || 5 || 3:00
|-
! style=background:white colspan=9 |
|-  style="background:#cfc;"
| 1992-05-30|| Win ||align=left| Takashi Nakajima || AJKF ||  Tokyo, Japan ||  ||  ||
|-  style="background:#;"
| 1992-01-|| ||align=left| Tadayuki Sugawara || AJKF ||  Tokyo, Japan ||  ||  ||
|-  style="background:#;"
| 1990-07-14|| ||align=left| || AJKF ||  Tokyo, Japan ||  ||  ||
|-  style="background:#cfc;"
| 1989|| Win ||align=left|  || Nakhon Pathom Stadium||  Nakhon Pathom, Thailand || Decision || 5 || 3:00
|-  style="background:#cfc;"
| 1989-02-17|| Win ||align=left| Hidekazu Miyake || Shoot Boxing - Handicap Match 60 kg vs 65 kg ||  Tokyo, Japan ||2nd Ext.R Decision (Unanimous) || 5 || 3:00
|-  style="background:#cfc;"
| 1988-09-17|| Win ||align=left| Shinji Koshino || Shoot Boxing ||  Tokyo, Japan || Ext.R Decision (Unanimous) || 4 || 3:00
|-  style="background:#fbb"
| 1988-04-03|| Loss||align=left| Li Sogi || Shoot Boxing World Revolution Sengen ||  Tokyo, Japan || KO  || 1 || 1:13
|-  style="background:#fbb;"
| 1988-01-31|| Loss ||align=left| Hidekazu Miyake || Shoot Boxing '88 First Match ||  Tokyo, Japan || Decision  || 3 || 3:00
|-  style="background:#cfc;"
| 1987-10-10|| Win||align=left| Hidekazu Miyake || Shoot Boxing vs Okinawa Karate ||  Tokyo, Japan || KO || 4 (Ext.R) || 2:23
|-
| colspan=9 | Legend''':

Acting Work 
 Rokudenashi Blues (1996)
 Jigoku-do Reikai Tsushin (1996)
 Rokudenashi Blues'98 (1998)
 Abare Bunya (1998)
 Shin Shonan Bosozoku Arakure Knight 4

References

Living people
1968 births
Japanese male kickboxers